Harlapur is a village in the Gadag district of Karnataka State in India.

Demographics
Per the 2011 Census of India, Harlapur has a total population of 4714; of whom 2406 are male and 2308 female.

Transport
Harlapur is 15 km from Gadag.  There is a railway station in Harlapur.

See also
 Lakkundi
 Timmapur, Gadag
 Kanaginahal
 Yarehanchinal
 Gadag

References

Villages in Gadag district